The 2023 Nigerian Senate elections in Rivers State will be held on 25 February 2023, to elect the 3 federal Senators from Rivers State, one from each of the state's three senatorial districts. The elections will coincide with the 2023 presidential election, as well as other elections to the Senate and elections to the House of Representatives; with state elections being held two weeks later. Primaries were held between 4 April and 9 June 2022.

Background
In the previous Senate elections, none of the three incumbent senators were returned as Magnus Ngei Abe (APC-Rivers South East) retired to run for Governor while Andrew Uchendu (APC-East) and Osinakachukwu Ideozu (APC-Rivers West) could not run for re-election due to the disqualification of all Rivers APC candidates. George Thompson Sekibo (PDP) won the East seat with 89% of the vote, Barry Mpigi (PDP) won the South East seat with 95%, and Betty Apiafi (PDP) won the West seat with 79%. The senatorial results were an example of continued PDP strength in the state as the party also won all House of Representatives seats and Abubakar won the state in the presidential election by 50%; the PDP also won a majority in the House of Assembly and the gubernatorial election.

Overview

Summary

Rivers East 

The Rivers East Senatorial District covers the local government areas of Emohua, Etche, Ikwerre, Obio-Akpor, Ogu–Bolo, Okrika, Omuma, and Port Harcourt. Incumbent George Thompson Sekibo (PDP) was elected with 89.1% of the vote in 2019. Sekibo opted to run for governor of Rivers State instead of seeking re-election; he came joint-last in the PDP gubernatorial primary.

General election

Results

Rivers South East 

The Rivers South East Senatorial District covers the local government areas of Andoni, Eleme, Gokana, Khana, Opobo–Nkoro, Oyigbo, and Tai. Incumbent Barry Mpigi (PDP), who was elected with 94.7% of the vote in 2019, is seeking re-election.

General election

Results

Rivers West 

The Rivers West Senatorial District covers the local government areas of Abua–Odual, Ahoada East, Ahoada West, Akuku-Toru, Asari-Toru, Bonny, Degema, and Ogba–Egbema–Ndoni. Incumbent Betty Apiafi (PDP), who was elected with 79.2% of the vote in 2019, is not seeking re-election.

General election

Results

See also 
 2023 Nigerian Senate election
 2023 Nigerian elections
 2023 Rivers State elections

References 

Rivers State senatorial elections
2023 Rivers State elections
Rivers State Senate elections